The women's road race H1-2-3-4 cycling event at the 2016 Summer Paralympics took place on September 17 at Pontal, Rio.  The race distance was 60 km.

Results : Women's road race H1-2-3-4

References

Women's road race H1-4